The 2006–07 FIS Snowboard World Cup is a multi race tournament over a season for snowboarding. The season began on 13 October 2006, and finished on 18 March 2007.  The World Cup is organized by the FIS who also run world cups and championships in cross-country skiing, ski jumping, Nordic combined, alpine skiing, and freestyle skiing.

Calendar

Key

Men

Women

Men's Overall Results

Overall

Big air

Half pipe

Parallel slalom

Women's Overall Results

Half pipe

Parallel slalom

References

External links

FIS Snowboard World Cup
FIS Snowboard World Cup
FIS Snowboard World Cup